Ballot Measure 9 is a 1995 documentary film directed and produced by Heather MacDonald. The film examines the cultural and political battle that took place in 1992 over Oregon Ballot Measure 9, a citizens' initiative proposition that would have declared homosexuality "abnormal, wrong, unnatural, and perverse."

Awards
Audience Award at the Sundance Film Festival, 1995. 
Teddy Award at the Berlin International Film Festival, 1995.
"Best of the Fest" at the Edinburgh International Film Festival, 1995.
People's Choice Award at the Denver International Film Festival, 1995.

References

Further reading

External links

1995 films
American LGBT-related films
Films set in Oregon
LGBT in Oregon
1995 LGBT-related films
Documentary films about LGBT topics
Documentary films about American politics
LGBT politics in the United States
1995 documentary films
Documentary films about Oregon
1990s English-language films
1990s American films